Selma Township may refer to the following places in the United States:

Selma Township, Michigan
Selma Township, Cottonwood County, Minnesota
Selma Township, Johnston County, North Carolina

See also

Selma (disambiguation)

Township name disambiguation pages